The 1973 IIHF European U19 Championship was the sixth playing of the IIHF European Junior Championships.

Group A
Played in Leningrad, USSR, from March 20–27, 1973.

West Germany was relegated to Group B for 1974.

Tournament Awards
Top Scorer:  Vladimir Golikov  (15 Points)
Top Goalie:  Göran Högosta
Top Defenceman: František Joun
Top Forward:  Viktor Zhluktov

Group B 
Played in the Netherlands in March–April 1973

First round 
Group 1

Group 2

Placing round

Poland was promoted to Group A for 1974.

References

Complete results

Junior
IIHF European Junior Championship tournament
International ice hockey competitions hosted by the Soviet Union
International ice hockey competitions hosted by the Netherlands
1972–73 in Soviet ice hockey
March 1973 sports events in Europe
Sports competitions in Saint Petersburg
1970s in Leningrad
April 1973 sports events in Europe
1972–73 in Dutch ice hockey